Dichromanthus yucundaa is a terrestrial species of orchid. It is endemic to the State of Oaxaca in southern Mexico.

References

External links
Universidad Nacional Autónoma de México, Instituto de Biología, Especies nuevas para la Ciencia, Dichromanthus yucundaa

Spiranthinae
Orchids of Mexico
Flora of Oaxaca
Plants described in 2009